Greg D'Alba is the current president of CNN News Networks and Turner Digital Ad Sales and Marketing. D'Alba oversees all advertising sales, marketing strategies, and business operations for the CNN series of networks and Turner's digital news operations.  Previously he served as CNN's executive vice president and chief operating officer.

Education and background
Growing up in Buffalo, New York, D'Alba went on to graduate from the State University of New York at Buffalo with a B.A. in communications in 1981.  His colleague, Wolf Blitzer, is also an alumnus of Buffalo. Five years after graduating, D'Alba joined CNN as an account executive. His first television job was for WKBW-TV Channel 7 in Buffalo, New York.

Career
Having started working for CNN in 1986, D'Alba worked with Ted Turner to change the public's perception of CNN to that of an innovative and technological news broadcaster. He has focused on working with advertisers and collaborating with them on their messages shown on the network. As executive vice president and COO, D'Alba established a campaign to redesign CNN's ad sales.

Philanthropy and civic service
He is a board member of the Iraq and Afghanistan Veterans of America.

References

Living people
University at Buffalo alumni
CNN executives
Year of birth missing (living people)